Troed-y-rhiw (translation: foot of the slope) is a large community village in the county borough of Merthyr Tydfil, Wales. Its population at the 2011 census was 5,296.  It features the Troed-y-rhiw railway station.

Governance
The community shares a border with the electoral ward of Plymouth, which elects three county councillors to Merthyr Tydfil County Borough Council. At the May 2017 elections the ward re-elected three Labour Party councillors.

Community Archives Wales
In 2007 the Troedyrhiw Environment Forum joined the Community Archives Wales programme. The Environment Forum is a part of the Troedyrhiw Community Partnership which has approximately 30 registered members who attend all kinds of different forums including a Residents Association, Scouts Group and Old Age Persons Group. The Environment Forum has engaged all parts of the community in a range of community projects, including the Trevithick Heritage Trail.

Notable people
Welsh international footballer Charlie Jones, who played for Nottingham Forest and Arsenal in the 1920s and 1930s, was born in Troed-y-rhiw in 1899.
His Welsh international colleague Willie Davies, who played for several clubs, including Cardiff City and Tottenham Hotspur in the 1920s and 1930s, was born in Troed-y-rhiw in 1900.
Bobby Weale was another footballer born (in 1903) in Troed-y-rhiw. His career took him to Swindon Town and Southampton before returning to Wales to play for Cardiff City, Newport County and Wrexham.
Footballer Jim Lewis was born in Troed-y-rhiw in 1909 and played at left back for Watford from 1930 to 1939.
His younger brother, George Lewis was also born in Troed-y-rhiw (in 1913) and played football as a centre forward, first for Watford and then for Southampton.
Footballer Gwyn Jones, who played for Rochdale and Stockport County, was born in Troed-y-rhiw in 1912.
Vivian Woodward was born in Troed-y-rhiw in 1914 and played at inside-forward for Fulham from 1936 to 1947, with later spells at Millwall, Brentford and Aldershot, as well as playing once for Wales.
Actor Steve Speirs was born in Troed-y-rhiw in 1965.
Opera singer (tenor) and brother of Steve Speirs Jeffrey Lloyd Roberts was born in Troed-y-rhiw in 1968.

References

External links
Old Merthyr Tydfil: Troedyrhiw - Historical Photographs of Troedyrhiw.
Community Archives Wales
www.geograph.co.uk : photos of Troed-y-rhiw and surrounding area
 Articles by Professor E. Wyn James, of the School of Welsh, Cardiff University,  who is from Troed-y-rhiw, on popular poetry written and printed in Troed-y-rhiw:
 Zulus and Stone Breakers: A Case Study in Glamorgan Ballad-Sheet Printing (1999)
Watching the White Wheat and That Hole Below the Nose: The English Ballads of a Late-Nineteenth-Century Welsh Jobbing-Printer (2000)
 Golwg ar Rai o Gerddi a Baledi Cymraeg Troed-y-rhiw (2001)

Villages in Merthyr Tydfil County Borough
Communities in Merthyr Tydfil County Borough